Thomas Detry (born 13 January 1993) is a Belgian professional golfer who plays on the European Tour and PGA Tour. He was a highly ranked amateur golfer before turning professional. In his first professional win at the Bridgestone Challenge, he set Challenge Tour records for largest margin of victory and tied for lowest score under-par with Ivó Giner.

Early life
Detry was born in 1993 in Uccle, Belgium south of Brussels. He started playing golf when he was 5, but also played tennis and lawn hockey. He started competing in international golf tournaments when he was 13 years old. He studied at the Topsportschool Vlaanderen in Hasselt until 2012. In 2009, when he was 16 years old, Detry won the Dutch Junior Open, a competition for young golfers aged under 21.

Amateur career
After being part of the winning Belgian team at the 2010 European Boys' Team Championship at Klassis C&CC, Turkey, Detry was selected for the Junior Ryder Cup team (a competition between American and European youth) in 2010 and the Jacques Léglise Trophy team (pitting continental European boys against a team from the British Isles) in 2010 and 2011.

Detry represented Belgium at the Eisenhower Trophy three times, first time, in 2010, only 17 years old. He also represented Belgium at the European Amateur Team Championship and Europe in the Palmer Cup in 2014 and 2015.

Following fellow golfer and good friend Thomas Pieters, Detry studied Business Management at the University of Illinois from 2012 to 2016. He was named the Big Ten Freshman of the Year in 2013 and the Big Ten Golfer of the Year in 2015.

He was named the best Belgian amateur golfer in 2013 and 2015.

After winning the 2016 Big Ten Championship, he was ranked the 5th best amateur golfer in the world by the World Amateur Golf Ranking.

Professional career
Detry turned professional in June 2016 and started competing on the Challenge Tour. He made the cut in his first 10 professional events, culminating in his win at the 2016 Bridgestone Challenge. With this win, he equaled the record for lowest under-par finish ever on the Challenge Tour (29 under par, set in 2003 by Ivó Giner), and set a new record for the win by the widest margin ever on the Challenge Tour – 12 strokes ahead of the second-place finisher. He also broke the course record at Heythrop Park Resort with his first round of 60 (12 under par).

On 24 November 2018, Detry won the 2018 World Cup of Golf with partner Thomas Pieters, representing Belgium, at Metropolitan Golf Club in Melbourne, Australia.

In August 2020, Detry twice finished sole runner-up at tournaments on the European Tour, at the Hero Open in Birmingham, England and at the Celtic Classic at Celtic Manor, Wales, both times beaten by Sam Horsfield, and advanced to 75th on the Official World Golf Ranking.

Amateur wins
2009 Riverwoods Junior Open
2010 Belgian National Juniors
2011 Grand Prix AFG, King's Prize, Belgium National Match Play
2012 Championnat de Ligue Amateur, Grand Prix AFG
2013 European Challenge Trophy (individual), Belgian International Amateur, Wolf Run Intercollegiate
2014 Sagamore Fall Preview
2015 Louisiana Classics, Boilermaker Invitational
2016 Big Ten Championship

Source:

Professional wins (2)

Challenge Tour wins (1)

Other wins (1)

Playoff record
European Tour playoff record (0–1)

Results in major championships
Results not in chronological order in 2020.

"T" = tied
NT = No tournament due to COVID-19 pandemic

Results in The Players Championship

CUT = missed the halfway cut

Results in World Golf Championships

1Cancelled due to COVID-19 pandemic

"T" = Tied
NT = No tournament

Team appearances
Amateur
European Boys' Team Championship (representing Belgium): 2007, 2008, 2009, 2010, 2011 (winners)
Jacques Léglise Trophy (representing Continental Europe): 2010 (winners), 2011
Junior Ryder Cup (representing Europe): 2010
Eisenhower Trophy (representing Belgium): 2010, 2012, 2014
European Amateur Team Championship (representing Belgium): 2014, 2015
Bonallack Trophy (representing Europe): 2012 (winners)
Palmer Cup (representing Europe): 2014 (winners), 2015

Professional
World Cup (representing Belgium): 2018 (winners)
Hero Cup (representing Continental Europe): 2023 (winners)

See also
2016 Challenge Tour graduates
2022 Korn Ferry Tour Finals graduates

References

External links
 
 
 
 
 
 

Belgian male golfers
European Tour golfers
PGA Tour golfers
Olympic golfers of Belgium
Golfers at the 2020 Summer Olympics
Illinois Fighting Illini men's golfers
Korn Ferry Tour graduates
Sportspeople from Brussels
1993 births
Living people